The Homeowners Affordability and Stability Plan is a U.S. program announced on February 18, 2009, by U.S. President Barack Obama. According to the US Treasury Department, it is a $75 billion program to help up to nine million homeowners avoid foreclosure, which was supplemented by $200 billion in additional funding for Fannie Mae and Freddie Mac to purchase and more easily refinance mortgages. The plan is funded mostly by the Housing and Economic Recovery Act. It uses cost sharing and incentives to encourage lenders to reduce homeowner's monthly payments to 31 percent of their gross monthly income. Under the program, a lender would be responsible for reducing total monthly mortgage payments (PITI) to no more than 38 percent of the borrower's income, with the government sharing the cost to further reduce the payment to 31 percent. The plan also involves potentially forgiving or deferring a portion of the borrower's mortgage balance. Mortgage servicers will receive incentives to modify loans and to help the homeowner stay current, though participation by lenders is voluntary.

See also
 Home Affordable Modification Program (HAMP)
 Home Affordable Refinance Program (HARP)

External links
Making Home Affordable

References

United States proposed federal legislation
2009 in American law
Subprime mortgage crisis
Mortgage legislation
Foreclosure